The Mityana–Mubende Road is a road in the Central Region of Uganda, connecting the towns of Mityana, in Mityana District and Mubende in Mubende District.

Location
The coordinates of the road near Kawungera are 0°26'50.0"N, 31°41'25.0"E (Latitude:0.447221; Longitude:31.690283).

Overview
This road is an important transport corridor between Mubende District and Mityana District. This road is part of the Kampala–Mityana–Mubende–Fort Portal transport corridor and is part of the East African road network, connecting Kenya, Uganda and DR Congo. The road is the primarily transport route for tourists to Kibaale National Park.

Upgrading to bitumen
This road was upgraded to class II bituminous standard prior to 2008. 

In April 2021, Energo Project Company Uganda Limited was contracted by the Uganda National Roads Authority, at a cost of UGX:396 billion (approx. The surface is to be improved to asphalt-concrete.

Under the same contract, the same road builder was contracted to tarmac an estimated  of Mityana Town urban roads. The work is expected to continue until April 2024. This is then expected to be followed by the 12 months of contactor defects liability period.

See also
 Mityana–Bukuya–Kiboga Road
 Myanzi–Kassanda–Bukuya–Kiboga Road
 Uganda National Roads Authority

Notes

References

External links
 Webpage of Uganda National Road Authority
  Uganda’s Road Network has improved significantly

Roads in Uganda
Mityana District
Mubende District
Central Region, Uganda